Edmund Molyneux Royds (1830–1918) was a politician in Queensland, Australia. He was a Member of the Queensland Legislative Assembly.

Politics
On 8 February 1864, Charles Royds, the Member for the electoral district of Leichhardt resigned and his brother Edmund Royds won the resulting by-election on 14 April 1864. On 11 May 1868, Edmund Royds resigned the seat, and his brother Charles won the resulting by-election in Leichhardt on 29 June 1868.

On 30 January 1872, Charles Royds resigned, and Edmund won the resulting by-election in Leichhardt on 20 February 1872. He held the seat until he resigned on 8 December 1875. Charles Haly won the resulting by-election on 12 January 1876.

See also
 Members of the Queensland Legislative Assembly, 1863–1867; 1867–1868; 1871–1873; 1873–1878

References

Members of the Queensland Legislative Assembly
1830 births
1918 deaths